Kris Eugene Lane (born April 7, 1967) is a Canadian–American Fulbright scholar, researcher, professor, and author. His areas of academic teaching and research focus on colonial Latin American history.  He has written and edited several books and articles on slavery, witchcraft, headhunting, mining, human trafficking, and piracy in the Caribbean.

Lane is the Frances V. Scholes Chair of Colonial Latin American History at Tulane University. He previously taught Latin American History at the College of William and Mary in Virginia, is the general editor of the Colonial Latin American Review, and a member of the board of editors of the Hispanic American Historical Review.

Early life 
Lane was born in Creston, British Columbia. He is the son of Rustin and Grace Fletcher. He was raised in Colorado, Texas, and British Columbia. Lane is married with one daughter. He attended the University of Colorado Boulder, graduating in 1991 with a bachelor's degree in History and Latin American Studies. In 1996, he earned his Ph.D in History from the University of Minnesota.

Career 
In 1997, Lane joined the teaching staff of the College of William and Mary in Virginia, where he taught history. During his employment, he was honored as one of the school's inaugural recipients of the Joseph Plumeri Award, which recognizes the university's faculty for excellence in teaching, research, and community service. He has also served as a visiting professor at the National University of Colombia and the University of Leiden.In 2011, he joined the history department at Tulane University where he has taught courses on an array of subjects including the environmental history of Latin America, piracy, mining, and archive research. He has also worked extensively on the history of the Bolivian city of Potosi and its long history of silver mining.

Lane has traveled extensively in South- and Central America and has written, edited, and collaborated in presenting his research on piracy, slavery, gold mining, headhunting, and witchcraft in colonial Ecuador and Colombia. , he serves as the general editor of the interdisciplinary journal Colonial Latin American Review.

He has also edited and wrote the introduction for Bernardo Vargas Machuca's work, Indian Militia and Description of the Indies and Defense and Discourse of the Western Conquests, following their translations from Spanish. Published in Madrid, the two works were training manuals for conquistadors, written in 1599 by Vargas, as an extension of his military service in Italy and South America.

Awards 
 2005: Fulbright Lecture Research Fellowship
 2005: Edwin Lieuwen Memorial Prize for Teaching, awarded by the Rocky Mountain Council of Latin American Studies
 2009: Joseph Plumeri Award for Faculty Excellence

Published works

Books 
 
 
 
 
 
 Potosí: The Silver City That Changed the World. Oakland: University of California Press. 2019. .

Journals

Footnotes

External links 
 Kris Lane at Tulane University

1967 births
21st-century American historians
21st-century American male writers
College of William & Mary faculty
Historians of Latin America
Living people
University of Minnesota College of Liberal Arts alumni
American male non-fiction writers